Wenzel Bürger was an architect who lived and worked in Chemnitz, Saxony from 1893 and who made a major contribution to the architectural heritage of the city.

External links
 

1869 births
1946 deaths
People from Jablonné v Podještědí
People from the Kingdom of Bohemia
German Bohemian people
20th-century German architects
19th-century German architects